Zachary Vincent Freemantle (born October 18, 2000) is an American college basketball player for the Xavier Musketeers of the Big East Conference.

Early life and high school career
Freemantle was born and grew up in Teaneck, New Jersey and attended Bergen Catholic High School. He averaged 18.9 points, 10.3 rebounds, 1.4 blocks, 1.3 assists and 1.3 steals and was named All-Bergen County in his junior season. As a senior, Freemantle averaged 17 points, 10.5 rebounds and 2 blocks per game as Bergen Catholic won the Non-Public A State Championship and reached the final of the 2019 Tournament of Champions. Freemantle was rated a four-star recruit and committed to play college basketball for Xavier during the summer before his senior year over offers from Penn State, Pittsburgh, Northwestern, Boston College and St. Joseph's.

College career
As a freshman, Freemantle averaged 7.5 points and 4.3 rebounds per game and was named to the Big East Conference All-Freshman Team after coming off the bench as a key reserve before starting the final 14 games of the season. Freemantle was named a team captain going into his sophomore season. On November 30, 2020, he scored 24 points and grabbed 12 rebounds in a 99–96 overtime win against Eastern Kentucky. Freemantle averaged 16.1 points and 8.9 rebounds per game as a sophomore. He was named to the Second Team All-Big East as well as Big East Co-Most Improved Player alongside Julian Champagnie. Freemantle averaged 10.4 points and 5.8 rebounds per game as a junior. He was suspended in the preseason prior to his senior year. As a senior, Freemantle averaged 15.2 points and 8.1 rebounds per game. He was sidelined with a foot injury on January 28, 2023, and he underwent season-ending surgery in March.

Career statistics

College

|-
| style="text-align:left;"| 2019–20
| style="text-align:left;"| Xavier
| 32 || 14 || 20.6 || .460 || .353 || .789 || 4.3 || .6 || .5 || .7 || 7.5
|-
| style="text-align:left;"| 2020–21
| style="text-align:left;"| Xavier
| 21 || 21 || 31.5 || .513 || .321 || .594 || 8.9 || 1.4 || .7 || .9 || 16.1
|- class="sortbottom"
| style="text-align:center;" colspan="2"| Career
| 53 || 35 || 24.9 || .490 || .330 || .686 || 6.1 || .9 || .6 || .8 || 10.9

References

External links
Xavier Musketeers bio

2000 births
Living people
American men's basketball players
Basketball players from New Jersey
Xavier Musketeers men's basketball players
Power forwards (basketball)
Centers (basketball)
People from Teaneck, New Jersey
Bergen Catholic High School alumni
Sportspeople from Bergen County, New Jersey